Nigel Richards (born 1967) is a New Zealand–Malaysian Scrabble player who is widely regarded as the greatest tournament-Scrabble player of all time. Born and raised in New Zealand, Richards became World Champion in 2007, and repeated the feat in 2011, 2013, 2018, and 2019, and remains the only person to have won the title more than once. He also won the third World English-Language Scrabble Players’ Association Championship (WESPAC) in 2019.

Richards is also a five-time U.S. national champion (four times consecutively from 2010 to 2013), an eight-time UK Open champion, an 11-time champion of the Singapore Open Scrabble Championship and a 15-time winner of the King's Cup in Bangkok, the world's biggest Scrabble competition. 

In 2015, despite not speaking French, Richards won the French World Scrabble Championships, after reportedly spending nine weeks studying the French dictionary. He won it again in 2018, and multiple duplicate titles from 2016.

Renowned for his eidetic and mathematical abilities, Richards has been described as a reclusive personality and has been rarely interviewed.

Playing history
Richards started playing competitive Scrabble at New Zealand's Christchurch Scrabble Club. Since beginning his competitive career in 1997, he has won about 75% of his tournament games, collecting an estimated USD 200,000 in prize money. In 2000 Richards moved to Malaysia.

2007
Richards won the World Scrabble Championship and earned USD 15,000 by winning a playoff, 3 games to 0, against Ganesh Asirvatham of Malaysia. The two qualified for the playoff by leading a field of 104 international experts after 24 rounds of a tournament held 9–12 November in Mumbai, India.

2008
Richards won the USA National Scrabble Championship and earned USD 25,000 by winning his last three games against the runner-up, 1998 champion Brian Cappelletto, for a record of 22 wins and 6 losses, with a cumulative spread of 1,340 points.

2009
Richards was the runner-up in the USA National Scrabble Championship in Dayton, Ohio, losing to Dave Wiegand but still winning 25 of the 31 matches.

2010
Richards won the USA National Scrabble Championship in Dallas, Texas, again winning 25 games. His performance in this tournament was so dominant that he clinched the title before the last day of competition began.

2011
He repeated his success in the World Scrabble Championship in Warsaw, Poland, winning a closely fought final against Australia's top player, Andrew Fisher.

Richards won the USA National Scrabble Championship in Dallas, Texas, winning 22 games, including his final two, to hold off a number of challengers.

2012
Richards won the USA National Scrabble Championship, in Orlando, Florida, winning 22 of 31 games. To win the title, Richards had to defeat past champion David Gibson by at least 170 points in the final game; he won it by 177 points. At the time of the victory, Richards became the only person to have won the event four times, as well as the only player to have won it in three consecutive years.

2013
Richards won 24 of 31 games to finish first at the National Scrabble Championship in Las Vegas, Nevada, in July. The championship was not decided until the last game. Though he lost the game to Komol Panyasophonlert, Richards kept the score close enough to retain the title for a record fourth consecutive time (and record fifth overall).

He became World Champion for a third time, beating Panyasophonlert in the final; as of 2013, the World Championship has been renamed the Scrabble Champions Tournament and will be held annually.

2015
On 20 July, Richards won the nonduplicate portion of the 2015 French World Scrabble Championship in Belgium after two months of studying the French lexicon. He does not speak French. He won 14 of the preliminary 17 games before defeating the 2014 runner-up Schélick Ilagou Rekawe in the final, two games to one. In the duplicate (rarely played in English, but played in French since 1972) he finished second, just one point behind the winner, Switzerland's David Bovet.

2017
Richards competed in the World Championship and became the first seed after the regular 30 games, but lost in the quarterfinal to the 8th seed David Eldar, who won the tournament.

Richards won the 2017 WGPO Word Cup.

2018
Richards won his fourth World Championship. He also competed in the NASPA Championship, losing to Joel Sherman in the final round. He competed in the French Championship and won his second Classique Championship and his second Elite Duplicate (without conceding a single point), Blitz Duplicate and Paires titles.

Richards placed 2nd at the 4th Niagara Falls International Open.

2019
Richards won his fifth World Championship and third Paires title.

Career achievements

World Championship

U.S. National Scrabble Championship

French Scrabble

Other achievements
 Fifteen-time Thailand International (King's Cup) winner (1999, twice in 2000, 2001, 2002, 2004, 2006, 2007, 2011, 2013, 2014, 2015, 2016, 2018, 2019)
 Three-time Thailand International (King's Cup) second (1999, 2005, 2008)
 Twelve-time Singapore Open Scrabble Championship winner (2000, 2001, 2002, 2003, 2004, 2007, 2008, 2009, 2010, 2012, 2014, 2016)
 Ten-time UK Open winner (2008, 2010, 2011, 2012, 2013, 2014, 2016, 2017, 2018, 2019)

References

External links
 The Enigmatic Nigel Richards: A profile by Stefan Fatsis
 A way with words: A profile by Tim Hume
 
 Archive of Nigel Richards' games.

New Zealand Scrabble players
Malaysian Scrabble players
Malaysian people of New Zealand descent
World Scrabble Championship winners
Living people
1967 births